The Andrew R. McGill House is a historic house in Saint Paul, Minnesota, United States.

Description and history 
It is the Queen Anne style home of Governor Andrew Ryan McGill (served 1887–1889); designed in 1888 by W. A. Hunt. Andrew R. McGill, the son of Angeline (née Martin) and Charles McGill, was born in Saegertown, Pennsylvania, on February 19, 1840. Andrew R. McGill served as a Nicollet County and St. Paul lawyer (1861–1869); private secretary to Governor Horace Austin (1870–1874); Minnesota insurance commissioner (1873–1887); governor (1887–1889); state senator (1899–1905); and St. Paul postmaster (1900–1905).

It was listed on the National Register of Historic Places on December 31, 1974.

References

External links

 National Register nomination form

Houses completed in 1888
Houses in Saint Paul, Minnesota
Houses on the National Register of Historic Places in Minnesota
National Register of Historic Places in Saint Paul, Minnesota
Queen Anne architecture in Minnesota
1888 establishments in Minnesota
Governor of Minnesota